Jaguar XJR is a nameplate used by Jaguar Cars for several line of vehicles:
Jaguar XJR Sportscars, a line of Group C race cars.
Several high performance versions of the company's flagship XJ saloons.

XJR